Sead "Sejo" Kovo (born 1970) is a Bosnian guitarist and songwriter. Formerly, he was a member of a Bosnian garage rock band Zabranjeno Pušenje.

Life and career 
Kovo was born and raised in Sarajevo, SR Bosnia and Herzegovina in 1970.

In 1994, Kovo moved to Paris, France, with a pop-rock band Overdream. Next to him, the band members are Samir Ćeramida, Dušan Vranić, Đani Pervan, and Boris Bačvić. The band released their only studio album in 1996.

In 1996, Kovo accompanied Sejo Sexon and Elvis J. Kurtović, with whom he restarted band Zabranjeno Pušenje, disbanded in the early 1990s. He performed on two studio albums; Fildžan viška (1997) and Agent tajne sile (1999).

In 2007, Kovo released his solo album Je Tombe. Most of the recorded songs are in French, while in English and Bosnian there are three songs in total.

Discography 
Studio albums
 Je Tombe (2007) 

Overdream
 Overdream (1996)

Zabranjeno Pušenje
 Fildžan viška (1997)
 Agent tajne sile (1999)

References

External links
 Sejo Kovo on Discogs

1970 births
Living people
Bosnia and Herzegovina guitarists
Bosnia and Herzegovina male guitarists
Bosnia and Herzegovina rock musicians
Bosnia and Herzegovina songwriters
Bosnia and Herzegovina expatriates in France
Musicians from Sarajevo
Zabranjeno pušenje members
Date of birth missing (living people)